San Vittore is a prison in the city center of Milan, Italy. 
Its construction started in 1872 and opened on 7 July 1879. 
The prison has place for 600 inmates, but it had 1036 prisoners in 2017.

History
The construction of the new prison was decided after the Italian unification, together with other infrastructure improvement works in Milan in the period between the unification and the city's first town plan of 1889. Until then, prisoners were detained in several other structures not designed as prisons, among them the former Sant'Antonio Abate convent, in the Courthouse and in the former San Vittore convent.

For the construction of the new structure the government acquired terrains in the outskirts of the city, in a sparsely developed area at that time. The building, designed by the engineer Francesco Lucca, takes inspiration from the 18th century Panopticon, with 6 wings with three floors each. The perimeter walls were originally built in medieval style, but they have almost all been rebuilt with modern standards for security reasons.

Fascist occupation
During Fascism occupation the San Vittore Prison was used as a house for every enemy (political or war enemy). Since Germans took over the power in Italy, in 1943, a lot of changes happened in the prison, until the big riots happened in April 1946.

German occupation
During the German occupation in World War II (1943 – 1945) the prison was partly subject to German jurisdiction, with the SS in control of one of the wings. The prison gained notoriety during the war through the inhumane treatment of inmates by the SS guards and the torture carried out there. On 10 August 1944 15 captured partisans held at the prison, hand picked by Theo Saevecke, head of the Gestapo in Milan, were publicly executed at Piazzale Loreto and left on display, as a reprisal for a partisan attack on a German military convoy.

The prisons served as a way station for Jews arrested in northern Italy, which would be brought to San Vittore Prison and, from there, to Milano Centrale railway station, from where they would be loaded into freight cars on a secret track underneath the station.

On March 9 2020 inmates climbed onto the roofs and set fire to cells amid chaos in prisons sparked by the government new restrictions due to the COVID-19 pandemic.

Notable inmates
Mike Bongiorno, television host. Detained for 7 months in 1943 before being transferred to Mauthausen concentration camp.
Indro Montanelli, journalist and historian, shared prison cell with Bongiorno.
Gaetano Bresci, anarchist, detained from 29 July to 5 November 1900.
Renato Vallanzasca, Italian criminal.
Salvatore Riina, Italian criminal, former chief of the Sicilian Mafia.
Fabrizio Corona, television personality.
Patrizia Reggiani, ex-wife of Maurizio Gucci.
Dorothy Gibson, American actress and Titanic survivor; escaped the prison with Montanelli and General Bartolo Zambon
Antonio Gramsci, Italian Marxist intellectual.

References

Bibliography
 Chiara Bricarelli (a cura di), Una gioventù offesa. Ebrei genovesi ricordano
 Luigi Borgomaneri, Hitler a Milano: crimini di Theodor Saevecke capo della Gestapo,  Roma, Datanews, 1997.
E. Grottanelli, L'amministrazione comunale di Milano e la costruzione del carcere di San Vittore, in "Storia in Lombardia," quadrimestrale dell'Istituto lombardo per la storia del movimento di liberazione in Italia, Milano, Franco Angeli Editore, anno IV, n. 2, 1985.
Antonio  Quatela, "Sei petali di sbarre e cemento", Mursia Editore, Milano, 2013.

Prisons in Italy
Buildings and structures in Milan
1879 establishments in Italy